Birri may refer to:

Birri language, a central Sudanic language of the Central African Republic
Fernando Birri (1925–2017), Argentine filmmaker
Birri Gubba people, an Aboriginal Australian people of northern Queensland
Biri language, their language

See also
Ouled Birri (Moorish tribe)